Balwinder Sandhu (born 26 May 1987) is an Indian first-class cricketer who plays for Mumbai.

References

External links
 

1987 births
Living people
Indian cricketers
Mumbai cricketers
Cricketers from Mumbai